Endoplasmic reticulum lectin 1 is a protein that in humans is encoded by the ERLEC1 gene.

References

Further reading